The Tycannah Creek, a watercourse that is part of the Barwon catchment of the Murray-Darling basin, is located in the Orana region of New South Wales, Australia.

The creek rises on the northern side of the Nandewar Range and flows into the Mehi River downstream from Moree. On its way to the Mehi River, it flows through the village of Terry Hie Hie. There are five main creeks which feed into Tycannah Creek which are Bald Hill Creek, Crossing Creek, Bowman Creek, Berrygil Creek and Brigalow Creek.

Most of the land along Tycannah Creek is used for agriculture.

There have been many flooding events in Tycannah Creek. During February 2012, heavy rainfall in the upper catchment of Tycannah Creek lead to the evacuations of 12 people in the village of Terry Hie Hie. Flooding leading to evacuations also occurred in November 2011.

References

North West Slopes
Rivers of New South Wales
Murray-Darling basin